The Karuk Tribe is a federally 
 recognized Indian tribe of Karuk people. They are an indigenous people of California, located in the northwestern corner of the state, in Humboldt and Siskiyou counties. The Karuk Tribe is one of the largest Indian tribes in California.

As a government organization, the Karuk Tribe of California has demonstrated its ability to administer a multitude of social, cultural and economic programs effectively, earning the status of a "Self-Governance Tribe." The Tribal government currently employs more than 100 people in administrative, child welfare, community/economic development, education, elders, energy assistance, health, housing, human services and natural resources programs. In little more than a decade the Karuk Tribe has developed housing divisions, health clinics and Head Start programs in Orleans, Happy Camp and Yreka, its three major population centers. Through the tribally-chartered Karuk Community Development Corporation, the Karuk Tribe also has administered salmon fisheries enhancement projects, acquired and expanded a retail business, planned a small manufacturing plant, assisted a number of local people in starting small business enterprises and staffs Workforce Development personnel at Community Computer Centers in Orleans, Happy Camp and Yreka.

Land

The Karuk do not have a legally designated reservation but do have a number of small tracts held in trust by the federal government as well as tracts owned by the tribe in fee-simple status. These small non-contiguous parcels of land are primarily located along the Klamath River in western Siskiyou County and northeastern Humboldt County in California. A resident population of 333 persons was reported in the 2000 census. There are also a number of tracts located within the city of Yreka.

Government
The Karuk are headquartered in Happy Camp, California, governed by a nine-member council. As of 2016, it comprises:

 Chairman: Russell "Buster" Attebery
 Vice-chairman: Robert Super
 Secretary/Treasurer: Michael Thom
 Member-at-large: Renee Stauffer
 Member-at-large: Arch Super
 Member-at-large: Sonny Davis
 Member-at-large: Wilverna Reece
 Member-at-large: Alvis Johnson
 Member-at-large: Kristen King

Language
The Karuk people speak the Karuk language, a Shastan language belonging to the Hokan language family. The tribe has an active language revitalization program. With fewer than twelve active full-time speakers alive as of 2015, Karuk (also known as Karok, Quoratem, Charoc, and Quoratean) is considered to be a severely endangered language according to the Endangered Languages Project. Field recordings, primary texts, lexical resources, language descriptions, and other resources about the language have been archived by the University of California, Berkeley California Language Archive.

The ISO 639-3 symbol for the Karuk language is kyh.

Business
The tribe operates the Rain Rock Casino in Yreka, California.

The People's Center in Happy Camp is the tribe's museum and cultural center. The 5,000-foot building has a changing gallery, museum store, classroom, library, office for the language program, and archives and collections storage.

A tribally owned Internet service provider, Áan Chúuphan ("talking line"), installed fiber optic cable to provide Internet and cell service in the tribal center of Orleans. As of 2018, satellite internet access remains the only option for many residents.

Notes

References
 Pritzker, Barry M. A Native American Encyclopedia: History, Culture, and Peoples. Oxford: Oxford University Press, 2000.

External links
 Karuk Tribe, official website
 Traditional Karuk Ceremonial Activity on the Klamath River, USDA Forest Service

 
Federally recognized tribes in the United States
Native American tribes in California
Native Americans in Humboldt County, California
Siskiyou County, California